Deborah Cullen is an American art curator with a specialization in Latin American and Caribbean art.

Career
Deborah "Deb" Cullen earned her Ph.D. in 2002 from the City University of New York Graduate Center with a dissertation on the African-American master printmaker Robert Blackburn. Cullen was curator of the print collection at Blackburn's New York-based Printmaking Workshop from 1993 to 1996 and arranged for some 2500 of its holdings to be acquired by the Library of Congress, Washington, D.C. She is the curator of a retrospective on Blackburn, planned for fall 2014 at the David C. Driskell Center for the Study of the Visual Arts and Culture of African-Americans and the African Diaspora, at the University of Maryland, College Park.

Since 2013, she has been the Director and Chief Curator of the Miriam and Ira D. Wallach Art Gallery at Columbia University, New York. Prior to that, Cullen served as Director of Curatorial Programs at El Museo del Barrio, New York, from 1997 to 2013, where she curated about a dozen shows (and authored the corresponding catalogs) that have helped to inform and educate Americans about contemporary movements in Latin American and Caribbean art. She is one of a second generation of curators making sustained efforts to bring attention to Latino artists, following in the footsteps of Jacinto Quirarte, whose 1973 survey Mexican American Artists was a landmark in the field.

At El Museo, Cullen organized a series of group shows under the collective title "The (S) Files/The Selected Files" in 1999, 2000, 2002, and 2005. She was part of a curatorial team that organized the multi-venue exhibition "Caribbean: Crossroads of the World" at El Museo, the Queens Museum of Art, and the Studio Museum in Harlem, and she subsequently co-edited (with Elvis Fuentes) a companion anthology Caribbean: Crossroads of the World (El Museo del Barrio and Yale University Press, 2012). Her book Rafael Ferrer, springing from her 2013 show "Retro/Active: The Work of Rafael Ferrer," won the International Latino Book Awards first place prize for Best Arts Book. Her 2009 exhibition "Nexus" was called an "absorbing chronological history of the Latino art presence in this city in the first half of the last century". Her 2008 show for El Museo, "Arte (no es) Vida," won an Emily Hall Tremaine Exhibition Award. In 2002, she received a curatorial award from Faith Ringgold’s “Anyone Can Fly” Foundation. She has held curatorial fellowships at the Center for Curatorial Leadership in New York (2010) and at the J. Paul Getty Foundation (2001).

Cullen is a longtime Associate of the Los-Angeles-based Institute of Cultural Inquiry, for which she edited the 1997 volume Bataille's Eye & ICI Field Notes 4.

Cullen is married to the Puerto Rican artist Arnaldo Morales.

Curated exhibitions
 "Interruption: The 30th Biennial of Graphic Arts",  Ljubljana, Slovenia, 2013
 "El Pana/The Hive: The Third Poligraphic Trienal of San Juan", Puerto Rico, 2012
 "Retro/Active: The Work of Rafael Ferrer", El Museo Del Barrio, New York, 2010 
 "Nexus New York: Latin/American Artists in the Modern Metropolis", El Museo Del Barrio, New York, 2009 
 "Arte (no es) Vida: Actions by Artists of the Americas 1960-2000", El Museo Del Barrio, New York, 2008.

Publications
 Marisol: Sculpture and Works on Paper. With Marina Pacini, Bill Anthes, and Dore Ashton. Yale University Press, 2014.
 Interruption: 30th Ljubljana Biennial of Graphic Arts. Exhibition catalog, Black Dog Publishing, 2014.
 Rafael Ferrer. Vol. 7 of the "A Ver: Revisioning Art History" series, University of Minnesota Press, 2012.
 "Contact Zones." American Art vol. 26, no. 2, 2012, pp. 14–20.
 Caribbean: Crossroads of the World. Exhibition catalog with Elvis Fuentes. El Museo del Barrio and Yale University Press, 2012.
 "Busy Bees". Dawire: Online Platform for Contemporary Art, 2012.
 Nexus New York: Latin/American Artists in the Modern Metropolis. Exhibition catalog, Yale University Press, 2009.
 "Arte ≠ Vida: A History and Reflection on the Project". Hemispheric Institute, 8:1, 2009.
 Arte (no es) Vida: Actions by Artists of the Americas 1960-2000. Exhibition catalog. El Museo del Barrio, 2008.
"Felix Gonzalez-Torres: The Jigsaw Puzzles." In Searching for Sebald, L. Patt, ed. ICI Press, 2007.
  "A Life in Print: Robert Blackburn and American Printmaking". Anyone Can Fly Foundation website, ca. 2003.
 Here & There: Six Artists from San Juan. Exhibition catalog, Museo del Barrio, 2001.

Notes

Living people
American art curators
American women curators
Year of birth missing (living people)
21st-century American women